Pape Malik Dime (born October 6, 1992) is a Senegalese professional basketball player for Parma Basket of the VTB United League. He played college basketball for Indian Hills Community College and Washington Huskies. Dime entered the 2017 NBA draft, but was not selected in the draft's two rounds.

College career

Indian Hills 
Dime chose to play college basketball for Indian Hils college after finishing highschool at New Hope Christian Academy. As a sophomore, he averaged 10.8 points and 7.1 rebounds and 3.3 blocks per game in 30 games making 60.7 percent of his shots from the field.

Washington 
At his junior season, he was transferred to Washington Huskies, where he stayed for two seasons. During his tenure with the Huskies, he played along with players like Markelle Fultz, Matisse Thybulle, Marquese Chriss and Dejounte Murray. As a senior, Dime became the captain of the team and averaged 5.5 points, 5.4 rebounds and 2.4 blocks per game in 20 games.

Professional career
After going undrafted at the 2017 NBA Draft Dime joined the Northern Arizona Suns. He was waived on December 12, 2017, after appearing only in 7 games. He then joined Vogošća of the Bosnian League. He led the league in blocks, after averaging 4 blocks per game in only 16 games.

The next season, he signed with Ura opf the Korisliiga. He left the club on December and joined Rilski Sportist of the NBL. He also led the league in blocks, averaging 2.5 per game. During the summer, he also joined Guaros de Lara.

On October 13, 2019, he signed with Kyiv of the Ukrainian SuperLeague, but left the team after only appearing in 1 game. On November 16, 2019, he joined Lavrio of the Greek Basket League.

On July 9, 2020, Dime signed with MoraBanc Andorra of the Spanish Liga ACB. He averaged 5.8 points, 3.3 rebounds and 1.7 blocks per game. The team parted ways with him on July 1, 2021.

On August 29, 2021, Dime signed with Maccabi Rishon LeZion of the Israeli Basketball Premier League. He parted ways with the team on November 29, after averaging 7.4 points, 7.4 rebounds and 1.6 blocks per game. On December 2, Dime signed with Vanoli Cremona of the Italian Lega Basket Serie A (LBA).

On July 1, 2022, he signed with Parma Basket of the VTB United League.

References

External links
Proballers Profile
Eurobasket.com Profile
RealGM.com Profile

1992 births
Living people
Basketball players from Dakar
BC Andorra players
Expatriate basketball people in Andorra
BC Kyiv players
BC Rilski Sportist players
Centers (basketball)
Guaros de Lara (basketball) players
Lavrio B.C. players
Liga ACB players
Northern Arizona Suns players
Parma Basket players
Senegalese expatriate basketball people in Bosnia and Herzegovina
Senegalese expatriate basketball people in Bulgaria
Senegalese expatriate basketball people in Greece
Senegalese expatriate basketball people in Finland
Senegalese expatriate basketball people in Turkey
Senegalese expatriate basketball people in Ukraine
Senegalese expatriate basketball people in the United States
Senegalese expatriate basketball people in Venezuela
Senegalese men's basketball players
Vanoli Cremona players